Russian Fairy Tales, or Russian Folk Tales may refer to :

Russian fairy tale (skazka), generally
Any story from the Folklore of Russia
Some forms of Russian bylina, a traditional oral epic poem
Narodnye russkie skazki (Russian Folk Tales), collected c.1850 by Alexander Afanasyev, including various modern English translation collections

Various English translations
Russian Fairy Tales, R.Nisbet Bain's 1892 translation from Pyotr Polevoy's extracts from Afanasyev's tales
Old Peter's Russian Tales,  collection of Russian folk-tales in English by Arthur Ransome
Russian Folk Tales, (1873) translated by William Ralston Shedden-Ralston, from various Russian sources
The Russian Fairy Book, by Nathan Haskell Dole (1907)
The Russian Garland of Fairy Tales, (1916) unattributed translations by Robert Steele
Russian Fairy Tales, (1919) translated by A. Brylinska from various Russian sources